Amanda Furrer (born January 17, 1991) is an American rifle shooter who competes in the 50 metre rifle three positions event. She won a bronze medal at the 2007 Pan American Games. She competed at the 2012 Summer Olympics, where she placed 15th in the 50 m rifle three positions event.

Furrer was also an alternate at the 2008 Summer Olympics.

References

External links
 Amanda Furrer at USA Shooting
 
 
 

1991 births
Living people
American female sport shooters
Olympic shooters of the United States
Shooters at the 2012 Summer Olympics
Shooters at the 2007 Pan American Games
Ohio State Buckeyes rifle shooters
Sportspeople from Spokane, Washington
Pan American Games bronze medalists for the United States
Pan American Games medalists in shooting
Shooters at the 2015 Pan American Games
Medalists at the 2007 Pan American Games
21st-century American women
20th-century American women